Mary Kathleen O'Malley (March 31, 1924 – February 25, 2019) was an American film and television actress, who was the daughter of vaudevillian and actor Pat O'Malley. Her screen debut came during the silent film era as a thirteen month old baby in 1926, when she appeared alongside her father and her sister Sheila in the western My Old Dutch.

O'Malley went on to appear in several films and television shows during a seven decade career, including Cover Girl, Lady on a Train, Two Tickets to Broadway, Gunsmoke, Maverick, Rawhide, Leave it to Beaver and General Hospital. O'Malley also appeared in the second season of Barnaby Jones; episode titled, "Blind Terror" (09/16/1973). Her last acting credit came in 1998 when she appeared in the short-lived American crime drama Buddy Faro.

Early life
O'Malley was born in Worcester, Massachusetts, to vaudevillian, stage and film actor Pat O'Malley. She made her screen debut at age 13 months in the film My Old Dutch, starring her father and including her older sister Sheila. It was released the following year in 1926. All three sisters (Eileen, Sheila & Kathleen) worked in show business as children.

Career

1940s
In 1943, she played the part of a college girl in the Vincent Sherman directed film Old Acquaintance which starred Bette Davis, Miriam Hopkins and Gig Young. The following year she was in the Charles Vidor directed Cover Girl, a film about a night club owner who was in love with a dancing girl who has other ambitions. In it she played the cigarette girl. The main stars of the film were Rita Hayworth and Gene Kelly. In November 1944, she appeared in the November 23 issue of the Sarasota Herald Tribune, pictured with a small caption "The Most Delightful Target for Our Bomb Sights." She was chosen by bombardiers of the US Army Air Forces.  In 1947 she played the part of Dolly in the Alexander Hall-directed musical fantasy Down to Earth, which again starred Hayworth and Roland Culver. In 1949 she played the part of Nita in Ladies of the Chorus which starred Marilyn Monroe, Adele Jergens and Rand Brooks.

1950s
O'Malley had a prominent role in John Ford's 1950 film, Wagon Master. She played the part of pretty Mormon girl Prudence Perkins. Her character Prudence creates an issue due to marrying young Mormon man Sandy instead of Jackson. Prudence is also the cause of a fight between two men who are both pursuing her. In 1952, she appeared as Mrs. Norton, a pilot's wife in the Tay Garnett Korean war film One Minute to Zero which starred Robert Mitchum and Ann Blyth.

Death
O'Malley died of Alzheimer's disease on February 25, 2019, at age 94.

Personal life
O'Malley was married to James Maloney who was also her agent. The couple had two children: Sean (b. 1958) and Darren (b. 1960). Maloney died on March 23, 1994.

Selected filmography

Early years

1970s-1990s

References

External links
 
 Aveleyman: Kathleen O'Malley
 Turner Classic Movies: Kathleen O'Malley

1924 births
2019 deaths
American film actresses
American television actresses
Place of death missing
People from Worcester, Massachusetts
21st-century American women